Porcine viruses may refer to:
Porcine epidemic diarrhea virus
Porcine reproductive and respiratory syndrome virus
Porcine circovirus
Porcine parvovirus